Leușeni is a commune in Hîncești District, Moldova. It is composed of two villages, Feteasca and Leușeni.

It is also a border crossing point between Moldova and Romania.

References

Communes of Hîncești District
Moldova–Romania border crossings
Populated places on the Prut